The 5 krooni banknote (5 EEK) is a denomination of the Estonian kroon, the former currency of Estonia. Paul Keres (1916–1975), an Estonian international Grandmaster and prominent chess theorist, is featured with an engraved portrait on the obverse.

The reverse features a panoramic view of the Hermann Castle in the Estonian city of Narva and, across the Narva river, the neighbouring Ivangorod Fortress. The 5 krooni banknote was first issued in June 1992, shortly after the restoration of the independent Republic of Estonia in August 1991, and it remained in circulation until the kroon was replaced by the euro. A 5 krooni coin was also minted but the banknote was in circulation in much greater numbers. As of now, the note can be exchanged indefinitely at the currency museum of Eesti Pank for €0.32.

History of the banknote
 1991: first series issued by the Bank of Estonia;
 1992: second series issued;
 1994: third series issued;
 2011: withdrawn from circulation and replaced by the euro

Security features 

Source:
 1991;1992
The watermark of the three lions is visible when the note is horizontal, but springs to life when the note is held against the light. The watermark is in two parts on the edges of the note. 
Each note contains a security thread. 
The portraits are printed in the main colour of the note and their raised surface can be felt with the fingertips. 
Each note has an individual serial number. The horizontal number on the left is printed in black and the vertical number on the right is printed in a different colour on each denomination. 
When the note is held at an angle to the light, the denomination of the note can be seen. 
 1994
New colour tints have been used in these areas. 
Silver ink has been incorporated into the note. 
A new style serial number appears on the right-hand side, in a different colour for each denomination. 
When the note is held up to the light, printed areas on the back of the note fill the unprinted areas on the front of the note.

See also
 Currencies related to the euro
 Estonian euro coins
 Currency board
 Estonian mark
 Economy of Estonia

References

External links
 Global Financial Data data series - Estonia Kroon
 The Global History of Currencies - Estonia

Currencies of Estonia
Five-base-unit banknotes